Lindiwe Ntombikayise Mjobo is a South African politician who has been a member of the National Assembly of South Africa since 2009. She is a member of the African National Congress. She has since been re-elected two times: in 2014 and 2019.

As of 2019, she has been a member of the Portfolio Committee on Public Works and Infrastructure. During her first term in the National Assembly (2009–2014), she was a member of the  Portfolio Committee On Mining, the  Portfolio Committee on Sport and Recreation and the  Portfolio Committee on Mineral Resources. Mjobo served on the  Portfolio Committee on Science and Technology, the  Portfolio Committee on Public Works and the  Portfolio Committee on Labour in her second term (2014–2019).

References

External links
Profile at Parliament of South Africa
Mjobo, Lindiwe Ntombikayise at African National Congress Parliamentary Caucus

Living people
Year of birth missing (living people)
Place of birth missing (living people)
People from KwaZulu-Natal
Zulu people
Members of the National Assembly of South Africa
Women members of the National Assembly of South Africa
African National Congress politicians